The Superintendent of Schools Buildings was a position assigned by the School Building Commission of the New York City Board of Education.

BOE Superintendents of School Buildings
Brooklyn Board of Education (until 1898)
1879-1898 — James W. Naughton (b. approx 1840 - d. Feb. 12, 1898)
Public School Society of New York (until 1842)
1837-1872 — Amnon Macvey (d. 1872)
New York City Board of Education (1842-2002)
1872-1886 — David I. Stagg (b. 1816 Paterson, NJ - d. 1886)
1886-1891 — George W. Debevoise (1840-1919)
1891-1923 — Charles B. J. Snyder (1860-1945)
1923-1927 — William H. Gompert (1875-1946)
1928-1938 — Walter C. Martin
1940s — Thomas Duff
1950s — William F. Correale
1970s — Samuel B. Leonard

(In 1898 New York City consolidated with Brooklyn, part of The Bronx, parts of Queens, and Staten Island)

DOE Directors of Architecture
1963 — Arthur G. Paletta (1909-1984) (appointed by the BOE Aug 8, 1963)

School Architects
1938-1952 — Harold Eric Kebbon (1890-1964), designed 100 buildings for the NYC BOE.

Building Commission

Past Chairmen

1890s — Robert Maclay (b. 1833 - d. July 28, 1898)
1920-1927 — John A. Ferguson, MD (b. 1870 Nova Scotia d. June 9, 1955 Ridgewood, NJ).  He oversaw the construction of 243 elementary schools and 14 high schools.
1948-1961 — Charles J. Bensley (b. Dec. 25, 1907 - d. June 3, 1995) He oversaw about 325 school projects totaling about $900 million.

Notes and references

External links
 New York City Department of Education
 NYC DOE School Construction Authority — official site

School districts in New York (state)